SilverHawks is an American animated television series developed by Rankin/Bass Productions and distributed by Lorimar-Telepictures in 1986. The animation was provided by Japanese studio Pacific Animation Corporation. In total, 65 episodes were made. It was created as a space-based equivalent of their previous series ThunderCats.

As was the case with ThunderCats, there was also a SilverHawks comic book series published by Marvel Comics under the imprint Star Comics.

Plot 
A bionic space enforcer called Commander Stargazer recruited the SilverHawks, heroes who are "partly metal, partly real", to fight the evil Mon*Star, an escaped alien mob boss who transforms into an enormous armor-plated creature with the help of Limbo's Moonstar.  Joining Mon*Star in his villainy is an intergalactic mob: the snakelike Yes-Man, the blade-armed Buzz-Saw, the "bull"-headed Mumbo-Jumbo, a weather controller called Windhammer, a shapeshifter known as Mo-Lec-U-Lar, a robotic card shark called Poker-Face, the weapons-heavy Hardware, and "the musical madness of" Melodia who uses a "keytar" that fires musical notes.

Quicksilver (formerly Jonathan Quick) leads the SilverHawks, with his metal bird companion Tally-Hawk at his side. Twins Emily and Will Hart became Steelheart and Steelwill, the SilverHawks's technician and strongman respectively. Country-singing Bluegrass piloted the team's ship, the Maraj (pronounced "mirage" on the series, but given that spelling on the Kenner toy). Rounding out the group is a youngster "from the planet of the mimes", named "The Copper Kidd" and usually called "Kidd" for short, a mathematical genius who spoke in whistles and computerized tones. Their bionic bodies are covered by a full-body close-fitting metal armor that only exposes the face and an arm, the armor is equipped with a retractile protective mask, retractable under-arm wings (except Bluegrass), thrusters on their heels, and laser-weapons in their shoulders.

Characters

Silverhawks

Main Silverhawks 
 Commander Stargazer (voiced by Bob McFadden) - a tough and grizzled old cop with bionic capabilities, he captured Mon*Star several years ago and had him imprisoned. Older than the other SilverHawks, he longs to return to Earth for either a vacation or for retirement. He chiefly serves as the SilverHawks "eyes and ears", keeping them apprised of their current situation. His first name is apparently Burt. In the SilverHawks' first adventure, Stargazer is depicted as the keeper of Tally-Hawk, who subsequently was teamed with Quicksilver. His armor is gold, covering the upper left portion of his head as well as his body, and his left eye has been replaced by a telescopic lens. Stargazer wears a white button up shirt, loosened necktie, suspenders and slacks, making him resemble a stereotypical plainclothes police officer.
 Quicksilver (voiced by Peter Newman) - Captain Jonathan Quick was the former head of Interplanetary Force H and is the field leader of the SilverHawks. Known for his quick reflexes (and even quicker thinking), Quicksilver is an accomplished tactician and athlete. His armor is silver in color.
 Bluegrass (voiced by Larry Kenney) - he is second-in-command of the SilverHawks and the chief pilot of the group as well as a cowboy at heart. He is the only active SilverHawk who cannot fly, but he is the one that pilots the team's vehicle the "Maraj". He uses his weapon/instrument (portrayed in the toyline as his weapon-bird with the name Sideman) and his lasso. He has an interface with the Maraj's piloting system, which he has affectionately dubbed "Hot Licks". His armor has a blue-silver shade, and he wears a red bandana around his neck and a cowboy hat.
 Steelheart & Steelwill (voiced by Maggie Wheeler and McFadden) - Sergeants Emily and Will Hart are fraternal twin siblings. They became Steelheart and Steelwill respectively when they joined the SilverHawks. They had artificial hearts implanted during their transformation. Their armors are both a dark steel color. They are the "gearheads" of the team. Due to an empathic bond, when one sibling feels something, the other feels it as well. Physically, they are the strongest members of the team.
 The Copper Kidd  (vocal effects provided by Pete Cannarozzi) - he is the youngest member of the SilverHawks, and the only one not from Earth. A mathematical genius from the Planet of the Mimes, he "speaks" in tones and whistles. His skin is blue except for white markings on his face that resemble the makeup of a mime. His armor is copper-colored but the wings have a silver-like appearance similar to those his teammates. A natural acrobat, the Copper Kidd has two razor-edged discs (one mounted on each hip) which he throws like Frisbees. At the end of each episode, he was quizzed in astronomy lessons by Bluegrass as training to become the reserve Maraj pilot (a role he later infrequently filled).

Minor Silverhawks 
 Hotwing (voiced by Adolph Caesar in earlier episodes, Doug Preis in later episodes) - a gold SilverHawk who was added mid-season. He is a magician and skilled illusionist. Hotwing received his powers from a mystical energy force that 'chose' him to bear the powers to fight against injustice. He has to recharge these powers every 14 years, otherwise he will die. One notable time was when Zeek the Beak tricked the mystic force into giving him these powers which would have resulted in Hotwing's death.
 Flashback (voiced by Newman) - a green time-traveling Silverhawk from the far future. When he meets the 'much older' Stargazer who tells him of the fateful day the SilverHawks died, Flashback travels back in time to save them from an exploding sun. He also traveled back in time to stop Hardware from destroying the SilverHawks (when the mad inventor sabotaged the Maraj during their hyperspace-sleep to Hawk-Haven from Earth, which would have caused the autopilot to fly them straight into the sun).
 Moon Stryker (voiced by Kenney) - a turquoise Silverhawk. He can propel himself through space by a powerful cyclone generated from propellers that emerge from his waist. He is cocky but an expert marksman, as demonstrated when he shot a pen out of Stargazer's hand when they first met in the episode "Battle Cruiser".
 Condor (voiced by McFadden) - an old ally of Stargazer, whom Condor calls "Gaze". Condor left the SilverHawks to become a private investigator before the series, but eventually returned. Instead of wings, he has a jetpack and his main weapon is a energy whip.

Weapon-birds 
 Tally-Hawk (Quicksilver)
 Side Man (Bluegrass)
 Rayzor (Steelheart)
 Stronghold (Steelwill)
 May-Day (Copper Kidd)
 Sly-Bird (Stargazer)
 Gyro (Hotwing)
 Backlash (Flashback)
 Tail-Spin (Moon Stryker)
 Jet Stream (Condor)
 Sky Shadow (Mon*Star) - a bat, rather than a bird
 Prowler (Hardware) - a green flying dragon
 Volt-Ure (Mo-Lec-U-Lar)
 Shredator (Buzz-Saw)
 Airshock (Mumbo-Jumbo)

Supporting characters 
 Seymour (voiced by Newman) - the television show's comic relief. Seymour is a space cabbie who frequently says "Y'know what I mean?" and speaks in a New York accent. He might be inspired by Space Cabbie, a 1950s science fiction character.
 Zeek the Beak - Seymour's pal. Zeek the Beak is a green bird-like alien who often accompanies Seymour on cab rides. His catch phrases are "You wanna buy a fish?" and the interjection "Zeek!"
 Harry is a robot that works as a bartender at a bar on the planet Fence. He appears in many episodes usually serving drinks.
 Professor Power works in the Artificial Sun and controls it. He is friendly with the SilverHawks and often helps them.
 Sanders is the governor in Bedlama, a planet similar to the Earth.
 Monotone is the computer that rules the planet Automata.
 Grod the Informer is an informant. He appears in episode 32 when he informs the mob of a rock that is supposed to be worth a fortune, the Savior Stone.
 Lord Cash is in charge of Dolar planet where there is plenty of money and is friendly to SilverHawks.
 Gotbucks - Dolar's security chief.
 Warden Lockup is in charge of the Penal Planet 10 where Limbo's criminals are kept. His face looks like a bird. Warden Lockup likes gambling because he is seen betting in Mon*star's Great Meteor Race.
 Cell Guard #1 - a rhinoceros-like creature that works for Warden Lockup and controls the corridors of the Penal planet.
 Cell Guard #2 - a one-wheeled robot that works for Warden Lockup and controls the corridors of the Penal planet. He is extremely weak (laser beams destroy him). He is usually with Cell Guard #1.

Villains 
 Mon*Star's Mob is an organized crime group that commits crimes throughout Limbo. They travel in three open-cab spacecraft called the Zoomer, Road Star, and Limbo Limo.
 Mon*Star (voiced by Earl Hammond) - the quintillionaire alien mob boss who escaped from his cell on Penal Planet 10. He appears as a feline muscular humanoid with dark hair streaked with red over all the body, a voluminous red mane and beard, and an eyepatch (with the symbol of a black star) covering his left eye. Utilizing beams from Limbo's Moonstar and the use of his Transformation Chamber, Mon*Star's body becomes encased on spiked armor-plating as he recites "Moonstar of Limbo, give me the might, the muscle, the menace, of MON*STAR!". In this state, he temporarily regains his left eye with it able to fire the crimson Light Star beam which has various effects, destructive and stunning. He has some bad blood with Stargazer due to their past conflicts and extends that animosity to the SilverHawks. Mon*star appears in all but two episodes (episodes number 15 and 45) where Hardware and the Bounty Hunter are the villains respectively.
 Sky-Runner is a giant "space-squid" that serve's as Mon*Star's mode of transportation.
 Yes-Man (voiced by McFadden) - Yes-Man is Mon*Star's all-purpose lackey, thrall, and/or sycophant. As his name suggests, he is Mon*Star's sidekick that only ever agrees with Mon*Star. He has a half-human, half-snake appearance. As a member of Mon*Star's Mob, Yes-Man operates the Transformation Chamber. Yes-Man once used the powers of the Moonstar alongside Mon*Star, but did not change form. The Moonstar primarily gave him increased mental abilities and ambition. This led to a feud between himself and his boss until the powers faded.
 Hardware (voiced by McFadden) - Hardware is the weapons specialist for Mon*Star's Mob. He is an extremely intelligent, short but bulky, light purple-skinned pink-haired creature who carries an oversized rucksack full of self-engineered weapons and equipment. Mon*Star considers Hardware his most dangerous minion because of his talent for invention. On one occasion when Mon*Star was recaptured, he had to use the Moonstar to empower a box that would enable Mon*Star to escape from Penal Planet 10.
 Melodia (voiced by Wheeler) - a musical mistress who serves as a nemesis and counterpart to the SilverHawks' Bluegrass, Melodia is the only female member of Mon*Star's Mob. Melodia is usually seen cruising around in the Limbo Limo, causing havoc and assorted acts of terror as diversions. Melodia almost always carries a musical synthesizer (called a "Sound Smasher") as a weapon. She is usually dressed in an exaggerated rock-singer outfit: two-shaded green hair; a short black dress; red belt with plug up battery pack for "Sound Smasher"; long red fingerless  gloves; half dark purple, half light pink tights; and dark blue glasses with a red 'music note' frame 
 Windhammer (voiced by Preis) - an eco-terrorist member of Mon*Star's Mob with a large tuning fork that enables him to manipulate or generate destructive weather patterns either on a planet or in space. Examples of the weather that he has manipulated have included lightnings and tornadoes. He is a muscular humanoid with azurine skin, long blonde hair, and large elf-like ears.
 Mo-Lec-U-Lar (voiced by Preis) - a molecule-themed shapeshifter whose primary form is a humanoid body composed of many spheres in various copper shades. He serves as the master of disguise and leading hitman of Mon*Star's Mob. Besides shapeshifting, Mo-Lec-U-Lar once became invisible in order to infiltrate the SilverHawks' base.
 Buzz-Saw (voiced by McFadden) - a sentient war machine of a light copper-shade that is a member of Mon*Star's Mob. Buzz-Saw has razor sharp circular saw cutting blades over its body that can be used as projectile weapons. It speaks with a high-pitched metallic voice.
 Poker-Face (voiced by Kenney) - the robotic sunglasses-wearing money man of Mon*Star's mob who has slot machines for his eyes and carries a cane decorated with playing card suits. He is the owner of the Starship Casino. Poker-Face always charges Mon*Star billions for new inventive ideas against the SilverHawks.
 Mumbo-Jumbo (voiced by Newman) - a copper-skinned robotic minotaur who is the muscle for Mon*Star's Mob. He is aided by his ability to "bulk up", growing larger and more muscular, increasing his strength by doing so. He speaks in metallic grunts which his associates seem to understand (though he usually pronounces Mon*Star's name properly) and appears to be on the low scale of the intellectual spectrum. His signature attack is a quadrupedal charge at an opponent. Mumbo-Jumbo is the sworn enemy of Steelheart because of Steelheart's strength and skill which takes him down easily.
 Timestopper (voiced by Kenney) - a cocky 14 year old juvenile delinquent nyctophobe with a chest device that has the ability to suspend all ambient motion and kinetic energy around him for one Limbo-Minute. He is often in the services of Mon*Star, but has no qualms about getting in his way if he isn't paid for the job. His nyctophobia is most likely from the fact his chest device is light-powered.
 Zero the Memory Thief - a long-nosed shady character who steals memories using a cattle prod-like weapon and records them on cassettes. He occasionally did business with Mon*Star's gang when the opportunity suited him. While he can steal memories, he cannot the memorized data the way his victims can.
 Smiley - a mummified boxer robot that is brought back to life by Poker-Face. He was once stopped by Commander Stargazer. Smiley is the heavyweight champion of Limbo. He is operated by remote control. In the Starship Casino, Smiley easily defeats both Mumbo-Jumbo and Buzz-Saw, but could not beat the SilverHawks. 
 Darkbird is an evil duplicate of Quicksilver, created by Hardware.
 Bounty Hunter is a muscular monster with a face resembling a Bulldog with high, pointed ears. He has a sparkling laser on his head and a red star on his belt. He was imprisoned by Stargazer for 200 years but escaped twice (broken out once by Mon*Star in episode 22 and the second time on his own in episode 45). He can absorb energy directed at him, and use it to sustain his physical form as well as grow larger and more powerful. He can only be defeated by the solar energy bazooka that Commander Stargazer has. He is extremely dangerous and powerful, as he has easily defeated all the original SilverHawks twice. He was stopped by Commander Stargazer and by the later SilverHawk Hotwing.
 Uncle Rattler (voiced by Newman) - Yes-Man's uncle. He appears in only one episode.

Three Outlaws from Fence 
They appear in many episodes and are friendly to Melodia and Poker-Face, though the three are usually betrayed by the Mon*Star's minions. They are often seen playing cards on the planet Fence:
 The Space Bandit
 Rhino - a rhinoceros-like mutant.
 Cyclops is a balloon body creature that is very weak.  Whenever he was shot, he would lose air and fly around like a punctured balloon.

Setting

The Galaxy of Limbo 
Despite being in outer space, Limbo has breathable air and characters are seen to fall off their vehicles as if in a gravity field. During the series various planets are shown:

Stars 
 Moonstar of Limbo - a solid star, it gives Mon*star his powers to transform.

Planets 
 Bedlama - a planet similar to Earth, though stars can be seen in its sky even during daytime. Hawk Haven is its satellite.
 Hawk Haven - the Silverhawks' base of operations. It orbits Bedlama.
 Brimstar - a planet where Mon*Star's mob operates. It is hollow, with Mon*Star's quarters inside it, and accessible from the outside via a large star-shaped opening on its crust. The surface of Brimstar is like a giant ship junkyard.
 Starship Casino is a Poker-Face's planet where gambling takes place. It's stationed outside of the SilverHawks' jurisdiction, beyond "the Lightyear Limit".
 Automata is a factory-sized half-planet, controlled by a supercomputer named Monotone, which is the only sentient being on the planet.
 Dolar is a hollow gem-looking bank planet.
 Fence is a small planetoid with a bar, frequented by criminals.
 Hanging Rock is the Bounty Hunter's planet. It is full of mountains and it has dangerous electro-rocks that absorb energy and feed it to the Bounty Hunter.

Other 
 The Artificial Sun is an antenna-looking device that performs all the functions of a sun and needs to be fueled frequently. It is run by Professor Power and has been the target of the Mob many times.
 Penal Planet 10 - a place where most criminals are kept. The Bounty Hunter and Smiley are there most of the time, but Hardware and Mon*star have been imprisoned there.

Production and release 
Rankin/Bass followed up their successful ThunderCats series with this series about a team of heroes in the 29th century who were given metal bodies and wings to stop organized crime in the Galaxy of Limbo. SilverHawks featured many of the same voice actors who had worked on ThunderCats, including Larry Kenney, Peter Newman, Earl Hammond, Doug Preis and Bob McFadden.

Lorimar-Telepictures was purchased by Warner Bros. in 1989, and the rights to SilverHawks are now held by Warner Bros. Television Distribution.

Reruns later aired on Cartoon Network from 2000 to 2001.

Episode list

Merchandise and other media

DVD releases 
In October 2008, Warner Home Video released SilverHawks: Volume 1 on DVD in Region 1 for the first time. The 4-disc set contains the first 32 episodes of the series.

In October 2011, Warner Bros. released SilverHawks: Volume 2 on DVD in region 1 via their Warner Archive Collection. This is a Manufacture-on-Demand (MOD) release, available exclusively through Warner's online store and Amazon.com. The 4-disc set contains the remaining 33 episodes of the series.

Action figures 
The SilverHawks action figure collection based on the animated series was produced by Kenner and first released in 1987. LJN, the makers of the ThunderCats figures, originally were to produce the SilverHawks figures but decided to pass on the project at the last minute. Each figure was packaged with a companion bird and, similar to Kenner's Super Powers Collection toyline, had an action feature of some type. The second series of figures is harder to find than the first with Ultrasonic Quicksilver being the most difficult. The MonStar with Laser Lance, Copper Kidd with Laser Discs, and the Copper Racer vehicle were not produced but were shown in the 1988 Kenner toy catalog. The Hawk Haven Fortress was also never released, due to the high production costs it would incur. Many recurring characters were never made, including Yes-Man, Melodia and Poker-Face.

Weapon-birds 
The weapon-birds are cyborg animal companions released with most of the action figures. While Tally-Hawk appeared in almost all of the episodes in the series, all other "weapon-birds" only appeared in a handful of episodes. In the episode "The Fighting Hawks", the weapon-birds for the Steel Twins were accidentally switched from the toy versions. The weapon-birds are listed below, with their toy partner's name in parentheses.

 Tally-Hawk (Quicksilver)
 Side Man (Bluegrass)
 Rayzor (Steelheart)
 Stronghold (Steelwill)
 May-Day (Copper Kidd)
 Sly-Bird (Stargazer)
 Gyro (Hotwing)
 Backlash (Flashback)
 Tail-Spin (Moon Stryker)
 Jet Stream (Condor)
 Sky Shadow (Mon*Star) - a bat, rather than a bird
 Prowler (Hardware) - a green flying dragon
 Volt-Ure (Mo-Lec-U-Lar)
 Shredator (Buzz-Saw)
 Airshock (Mumbo-Jumbo)

In 2021, a new line of Silverhawks action figures were announced.

Other merchandise 
Several other pieces of SilverHawks merchandise were released in the 1980s, including a board game, puzzles, bed sheets, and a plastic pencil pouch with the main characters on one side. Pajamas were also produced, which included wing flaps under the arms to more resemble the characters.

Comics 

Marvel Comics' kid-friendly imprint Star Comics (which also published ThunderCats) released a seven-issue series. Writers included Steve Perry, who also wrote for the animated series.

Other appearances 
In the 2011 ThunderCats remake, Mon*Star briefly appears in a cameo in the episode "Legacy". He was seen on a monitor on the bridge of Mumm-Ra's ship.

Reboot
As of July 2021, a reboot of Silverhawks is in development.

References

External links 

  Episode Guide 
 
  
  Silverhawks at Don Markstein's Toonopedia. Archived from the original on June 3, 2017.

1986 American television series debuts
1986 American television series endings
1986 comics debuts
1980s American animated television series
1980s American science fiction television series
Space Western television series
Television series by Warner Bros. Television Studios
Television series by Lorimar Television
Warner Bros. Television Studios franchises
1980s toys
Fictional cyborgs
Star Comics titles
First-run syndicated television programs in the United States
American children's animated action television series
American children's animated space adventure television series
American children's animated science fantasy television series
American children's animated superhero television series
Comics based on toys
English-language television shows
Rankin/Bass Productions television series
Television series by Telepictures
Television series by Lorimar-Telepictures
Television series set on fictional planets